Wheeleria kasachstanica is a moth of the family Pterophoridae that is endemic to Kazakhstan.

References

Moths described in 1995
Pterophorini
Endemic fauna of Kazakhstan
Moths of Asia